Christian Glatting (born 28 December 1986) is a German long distance runner.

Achievements

References
 

1986 births
Living people
German male long-distance runners
20th-century German people
21st-century German people